Saxifraga rivularis is a species of saxifrage known by several common names, including highland saxifrage, weak saxifrage, alpine brook saxifrage, and pygmy saxifrage.

Distribution
Saxifraga rivularis is native to the northern parts of the Northern Hemisphere, where it has a circumpolar distribution, occurring throughout the Arctic and into the alpine climates of mountainous temperate areas, such as the Sierra Nevada in California. It also occurs in the Highlands of Scotland, from which it takes its name, however it is very rare in this area. It can be found in moist and wet, rocky habitat, in substrates rich in nitrogen and organic material, such as bird rocks and mossy peat flats.

Description
Saxifraga rivularis is a small perennial herb growing not much more than 12 centimeters in maximum height. It has small, lobed leaves at the base and along the stem. Basal leaves are between 5-20mm in length, and petioles are substantially longer than the blade. The inflorescence arises on a hairy, erect peduncle bearing white-petaled flowers and reproductive bulbils.

References

External links
Jepson Manual Treatment - Saxifraga rivularis
Saxifraga rivularis - Photo gallery

rivularis
Flora of the Arctic
Alpine flora
Flora of Finland
Flora of Norway
Flora of Sweden
Flora of Russia
Flora of Siberia
Flora of Alaska
Flora of Canada
Flora of California
Flora of the Sierra Nevada (United States)
Plants described in 1753
Taxa named by Carl Linnaeus
Flora without expected TNC conservation status